Lai Shanzhang (born 7 November 1992) is a Chinese cyclist. He competed at the 2020 Summer Paralympics in the men's time trial C4–5 and mixed team sprint C1–5, winning a silver medal in the latter.

References

1992 births
Living people
Paralympic cyclists of China
Chinese male cyclists
People from Sanshui District
Cyclists from Guangdong
Cyclists at the 2020 Summer Paralympics
Medalists at the 2020 Summer Paralympics
Paralympic silver medalists for China
21st-century Chinese people